Marina Cunin is an American social-anthropologist.

Her research topics have included Japanese students' perceptions of university (Student Views in Japan: Fieldwork Publications, 2004), experiences of international students in Japan and return migration to Trinidad and Tobago.

References 

Year of birth missing (living people)
Living people
Social anthropologists
21st-century American women writers
American women children's writers
American children's writers
American women anthropologists
Place of birth missing (living people)